Systomus compressiformis is a species of cyprinid fish endemic to Inle Lake, Myanmar.  It is threatened by anthropogenic changes to the lake including the introduction of non-native species of plants and fishes.

References 

Systomus
Endemic fauna of Myanmar
Fish of Myanmar
Taxa named by Theodore Dru Alison Cockerell
Fish described in 1913